Manuel Gómez may refer to:
Manuel Gómez-Moreno Martínez (1870–1970), Spanish archaeologist
Manuel Gómez Morín (1897–1972), Mexican politician; founder of the National Action Party (PAN)
Manuel Gómez Pedraza (1789–1851), Mexican politician; former president of Mexico
Manuel Gómez Pereira (born 1958), Spanish screenwriter and film director
Manuel José Gómez Rufino (1820–1882), Argentine politician; governor of San Juan
Manuel Octavio Gómez (1934–1988), Cuban film director
Manuel Z. Gómez (1813–1871), Mexican politician and former governor of Nuevo León
Manuel Gomez (clarinettist) (1859–1922), Spanish clarinettist and founding member of the London Symphony Orchestra
Manuel Gómez Mora (born 1990), Mexican footballer

See also

Manuel Gomes (disambiguation)